Active reserve may refer to:

 United States Army Reserve 
Active Reserve (Czech Army)
Active reserve (KGB)